Alwasat is an Arabic-language Kuwaiti daily newspaper owned by the Alwazzan family .

See also
List of newspapers in Kuwait

External links
Official website

Arabic-language newspapers
Newspapers published in Kuwait
Mass media in Shuwaikh Port